Désirée Gerda Saskia Pamela Amneris Aida Nick (born 30 September 1956 in West-Berlin) is a German reality television personality, actress, dancer, and author.

Biography 
Born in Berlin, Nick studied ballet at Berliner Tanzakademie. She became a member of the ensemble of Deutsche Oper Berlin and later of Bavarian State Opera in Munich. Between 1982 and 1985 she lived in Munich and studied Roman Catholic theology. She then worked as a teacher for a few years.

In the 1990s, Nick worked as an actress. Her first film role was in Neurosia (1995) by Rosa von Praunheim. In 2000 she wrote her autobiography, Bestseller einer Diva – Seit Jahren vergriffen. In 2004, Nick had a legal issue with actress Anouschka Renzi. That same year, Nick became popular in Germany, when she won the TV show Ich bin ein Star – Holt mich hier raus!, the German version of I'm a Celebrity...Get Me Out of Here!.

Since 2005, Nick wrote several books. In one of them, Eva go home, she faced the controversial claims on her motherhood and family, published by former TV presenter Eva Herman.

Nick was in a relationship with Prince Heinrich Julius of Hanover for seventeen years; they have one son together, Oscar Nick (29 September 1996 in Berlin). In 2017 he became a British citizen, his new title is His Royal Highness, Oscar Julius Henry Prince of Hanover.

In the 2020 film Enfant Terrible about the life of filmmaker Rainer Werner Fassbinder, directed by Oskar Roehler, Nick plays the role of Barbara Valentin.

Desiree Nick vs. Eva Habermann 

The Goblin film cast and the director Eric Dean Hordes claim the actress Eva Habermann stole the Goblin film and recut it. Nick claimed, Habermann offered her €500 to sign a paper that states Habermann owns the movie rights. Habermann now wants to ban the film.

Works 

 1997: Bestseller einer Diva: Seit Jahren vergriffen. Droemer Knaur, Munich 1997.  (together with Volker Ludewig)
 2005: Gibt es ein Leben nach vierzig? Eine Anleitung zum Entfalten in Theorie und Praxis. Gustav Lübbe Verlag, Bergisch Gladbach 2005. 
 2006: Was unsere Mütter uns verschwiegen haben. Der Heimtrainer für Frauen in Nöten. Krüger, Frankfurt a.M. 2006. 
 2007: Eva go home! Eine Streitschrift. S. Fischer, Frankfurt a.M. 2007. 
 2008: Liebling, ich komm später: Das große Buch vom Seitensprung. Krüger, Frankfurt a.M. 2008. 
 2011: Gibt es ein Leben nach fünfzig? Mein Beitrag zum Klimawandel. Marion von Schröder, .
 2012: Fürstliche Leibspeisen. Gerichte mit Geschichte. Lingen Verlag, .
 2014: Neues von der Arschterrasse. Marion von Schröder, .
 2016: Säger und Rammler und andere Begegnungen mit der Männerwelt. Heyne Verlag, .
 2018: Nein ist das neue Ja. Eden Books, .
 2020: Der Lack bleibt dran! Gräfe und Unzer, .

References

External links 
 Official website by Désirée Nick
 Tagesspiegel interview 2006
 

20th-century German actresses
German women writers
German television personalities
Ich bin ein Star – Holt mich hier raus! winners
Living people
1956 births
German film actresses
German ballerinas
People from Berlin
Actresses from Berlin